When Love Comes Calling is an album by American singer Deniece Williams issued in June 1979 on ARC/Columbia Records. The album peaked at No. 27 on the Billboard Top Soul Albums chart.

Overview
When Love Comes Calling was produced by Ray Parker Jr. and David Foster. Artists such as Maurice White, Bill Champlin of Chicago and Toto's Steve Lukather guested on the album.

Covers
"Why Can't We Fall in Love" was covered by the soul group Tavares.
"God Knows" is a cover of a Debby Boone song.

Singles
The single, "I've Got the Next Dance", reached No. 1 on the Billboard Dance Club Play chart and No. 26 on the Billboard Hot Soul Songs chart.

Track listing

Charts

Personnel

Musicians
 Jack Ashford – tambourine (8)
 Sidney Barnes – background vocals (8)
 Eddie "Bongo" Brown – bongos (8)
 Ollie E. Brown – percussion (1, 8, 9)
 Bill Champlin – backing vocals (4, 6, 7, 10)
 Dyanne Chandler – backing vocals (1, 9)
 Gary Coleman – vibraphone (1, 9)
 Paulinho Da Costa – percussion (2, 7, 10)
 Frank DeCaro – string contractor (1, 5, 7-10)
 Scott Edwards – bass (8) 
 Larry Farrow – keyboards (1)
 Charles Fearing – guitar (1, 9)
 Richard Feldman – guitar (7)
 David Foster – keyboards (2, 4, 6, 7, 10), piano (5), arrangements (6), backing vocals (6), string arrangements (10)
 Ed Greene – drums (2, 4, 8)
 Gary Herbig – saxophone solo (4)
 Jerry Hey – horn arrangements (6, 7, 10)
 David Hungate – bass (6, 7, 10)
 Larry Jacobs – background vocals
 Jeremy Lubbock – string arrangements and  conductor (5)
 Steve Lukather – guitar (2, 4, 6, 7, 10)
 Greg Mathieson – arrangements (4)
 Bill K. Myers – string arrangements (7)
 Don Myrick – saxophone solo (8)
 Gene Page – horn arrangements (1, 8, 9), string arrangements (1, 8, 9)
 Sarah Pagé – string contractor (1, 5, 7-10)
 Ray Parker Jr. – guitar (1, 2, 4, 6, 8, 9), backing vocals (1)
 Greg Phillinganes – keyboards (8, 9)
 Jeff Porcaro – drums (1, 6, 7, 9, 10)
 Mike Porcaro – bass (2, 4)
 Sylvester Rivers – keyboards (1), arrangements (1), rhythm arrangements (2, 8, 9)
 David Sheilds – bass (1, 9)
 Julia Tillman Waters – backing vocals (2)
 Wah Wah Watson – guitar (8)
 Maurice White – backing vocals (1, 10)
 Maxine Willard Waters – backing vocals (1, 2, 9)
 Deniece Williams – lead vocals, backing vocals (1, 2, 4, 7, 9, 10)

Production
 Producers – Ray Parker Jr. (Tracks 1, 3, 8 & 9); David Foster (Tracks 2, 4-7 & 10).
 Co-Producer – Deniece Williams
 Engineers – Humberto Gatica (Tracks 1-7, 9 & 10); Ron Malo (Track 8).
 Assistant Engineers – Corey Bailey, Mark Linett, Michael Mancini, Raffaello Mazza and Bo Torian.
 Design – Nancy Donald
 Photography – Richard Arrindell
 Management – Cavallo-Ruffalo Management

References

Deniece Williams albums
1979 albums
Albums produced by David Foster
Albums produced by Ray Parker Jr.
Columbia Records albums
ARC Records albums